Strawberry Shortcakes aka. Sweet Cream & Red Strawberries is a one-volume manga written and illustrated by Kiriko Nananan, published by Shodensha in 2002. It is about the lives of four young women in a large city. It was licensed in French by Casterman manga imprint Sakka and in Italy by Kappa Edizioni. Strawberry Shortcakes was adapted into a film of the same title. It was once licensed for English release by Central Park Media as Sweet Cream & Red Strawberries.

Reception
Xavier Guilbert, writing for du9, feels it is quite different from other josei manga. M. Natali, writing for BD Gest', notes that the nonlinear presentation of the women's stories reinforces the connection between the characters, a resonance between the four characters lives, their feelings and disappointments. The reviewer for Manga-News said that the author "managed to get it right". Art wise both du9 and BD Gest' described it as uncluttered & aerial, and the use of oblong panels taking all the width of the page as reinforcing the impression of intimacy.

References

External links

2002 manga
Josei manga
Japanese drama films
Shodensha franchises
Shodensha manga